Dayer (also Romanized as Dāyer) is a village in Howmeh-ye Sharqi Rural District, in the Central District of Khorramshahr County, Khuzestan Province, Iran. At the 2006 census, its population was 24, in 4 families.

References 

Populated places in Khorramshahr County